Accra Metropolitan Assembly (AMA) is the political and administrative authority for the city of Accra.
 The Accra Metropolitan Assembly has a general assembly which is constituted by about 102 members: two-thirds are elected representatives and one-third are government appointees. The Assembly has ten sub-metropolitan district councils which are subordinate to the general assembly. They perform functions assigned to them by the instrument that sets up the Assembly or delegated to them by the general assembly.

The Departments in the Administration Setup of AMA

The president of Ghana nominates a person for the office of the Mayor of Accra, also known as the Metropolitan Chief Executive. Then the nominee must be approved by at least two-thirds of the general assembly membership.

References

Government of Ghana